Cheylard-l'Évêque is a commune in the Lozère department in southern France.

Sagnerousse, which is within the commune of Cheylard-l'Évêque, and the village of Cheylard-l'Évêque itself, were visited by Robert Louis Stevenson on September 24 and 25, 1878, respectively. They are mentioned in Travels with a Donkey in the Cévennes. The Robert Louis Stevenson Trail (GR 70), a popular long-distance path approximately following Stevenson's journey, runs through both settlements.

See also
Communes of the Lozère department

References

External links
Le Cheylard l'Evêque in Lozere 

Communes of Lozère